WTLA (1200 AM; "ESPN Radio 97.7") is a commercial radio station licensed to North Syracuse, New York, and serving the Syracuse metropolitan area.  The station is owned by Galaxy Communications and airs a sports radio format.  Programming is also simulcast on co-owned AM 1440 WSGO in Oswego, New York.

WTLA operates with 1,000 watts.  Because 1200 AM is a clear channel frequency reserved for Class A WOAI San Antonio, WTLA uses a directional antenna at night to avoid interference when radio waves travel farther.  WTLA's transmitter is off Davis Road North in Cicero, New York, near Interstate 481.  WTLA also is heard on 120-watt FM translator W249BC at 97.7 MHz in nearby Mattydale, New York.

Programming
WTLA and WSGO have several local weekday sports shows, in middays and afternoon drive time.  The rest of the schedule features programming from ESPN Radio, the Syracuse ISP Sports Network (carrying Syracuse University sports), the New York Giants Radio Network and the NFL on Westwood One.  WTLA/WSGO had previously carried New York Mets baseball games until the New York Mets Radio Network was discontinued in 2019 due to the high cost of satellite time.

History
The station signed on the air August 1, 1959.  Its call sign was WSOQ and it broadcast on 1220 AM.  On that frequency, WSOQ was a daytimer.  Due to longer established stations on 1220, WSOQ had to go off the air at sunset each day to avoid interference.   The station was owned by Sol Panitz and Harry Winton, and was a Mutual Broadcasting System network affiliate.

Over the years, the station used the call letters WEZG, WURS, and WXRA.

In 1991, the station moved to its current frequency.  It had attempted to move its spot on the dial since 1980, hoping to find a frequency where it could broadcast around the clock.  A few months later, the station was renamed WNSS.  It then became WKRL in 1993, and WTLA in 1995.

Until March 5, 2010, WTLA offered an adult standards format from the "Music of Your Life" network.  On that date, it affiliated with ESPN Radio.  A local afternoon show, "Disturbing The Peace" was added in May 2010, focusing on Syracuse and New York sports.  In January 2011, programs hosted by Mike Bristol (who had previously been heard on AM 620 WHEN) were picked up by WTLA.

Actor Daniel Baldwin began hosting a one-hour weekday sports program on WTLA/WSGO in 2017.  The show ended in April 2019.

Translators

References

External links

TLA
Radio stations established in 1959
ESPN Radio stations
Sports in Onondaga County, New York
Sports in Syracuse, New York